Hairy Jeremy is a French stop-motion animated television show by Pierre Scarella in which was made in 1992. It was dubbed and shown in the United Kingdom on CBBC. It was narrated by Regine Candler.

The show focuses on a caveman called Hairy Jeremy and his misadventures he has with his prehistoric friends.

Characters 
 Hairy Jeremy - A Caveman with a face so hairy that only his nose is visible. Although whenever he's surprised, his eye or eyes do appear. He is, although supposedly a friendly caveman,  mostly very grumpy whenever he's annoyed or if anyone disturbs his nap.
 Arabella - An orange furred Platypus who is a friend to Hairy Jeremy.
 Milly & Tilly - Emu twins who the Narrator often gets muddled.
 Opterod - A posh speaking moustached grey dinosaur with ears. He was on one occasion called Bernard.
 Chucklesaurus - A small green dinosaur who is a practical joker to Hairy Jeremy.
 Squawk - A talkative bird that talks in squawks.
 Eggheads - Elephant-like egg shaped creatures with big noses and small ears that allow them to fly.
 Kite Birds - Little blue birds that look like Kites.
 Terry Dactyl - A Pterodactyl who is not only bad at flying, but is also bad at landing.
 Dino Monster - Huge dinosaurs that the friends are sometimes scared of. One of which is a mother to a baby who Hairy Jeremy helped hatch in one episode.
Baby Dino  - A baby dinosaur of the dino monster.

External links
IMDb entry

1992 French television series debuts
1992 French television series endings
1994 British television series debuts
1994 British television series endings
1990s British children's television series
BBC children's television shows
British children's animated comedy television series
French children's animated comedy television series
English-language television shows
Stop-motion animated television series
British stop-motion animated television series
Prehistoric people in popular culture